The Treaty of Canfranc was an agreement, signed in October 1288, between Edward I of England and Alfonso III of Aragon about the release of Charles II of Naples, who had been captured by the Admiral of Sicily, Roger of Lauria, in a naval battle on 5 June 1284.

References

Sources

 
 

War of the Sicilian Vespers
1288 in Europe
Treaties of the Crown of Aragon
Treaties of England
1280s treaties